Dryopolystichum is a genus of ferns in the family Lomariopsidaceae, with a single species Dryopolystichum phaeostigma.

Taxonomy
The genus Dryopolystichum was first erected by Edwin Copeland in 1947 for the species Aspidium phaeostigma. In the Pteridophyte Phylogeny Group classification of 2016 (PPG I), the genus was placed in the family Dryopteridaceae, although left unplaced as to subfamily. It has since been transferred to the family Lomariopsidaceae as a result of molecular phylogenetic evidence.

References

Polypodiales
Monotypic fern genera
Taxa named by Vincenzo de Cesati